Licneremaeoidea is a superfamily of mites in the order Oribatida. There are about 6 families and more than 170 described species in Licneremaeoidea.

Families
These six families belong to the superfamily Licneremaeoidea:
 Dendroeremaeidae Behan-Pelletier, Eamer & Clayton, 2005
 Lamellareidae Balogh, 1972
 Licneremaeidae Grandjean, 1931
 Micreremidae Grandjean, 1954
 Passalozetidae Grandjean, 1954
 Scutoverticidae Grandjean, 1954

References

Further reading

 
 
 
 

Acariformes
Articles created by Qbugbot
Arachnid superfamilies